The term green left refers primarily to a political affiliation that combines elements of green politics and left-wing politics in countries where the term is used. It is primarily a social justice and human rights oriented ideology, with an expansion in focus to the rights of other species. It is often used in contrast with center-left green parties, that attempt to reconcile their environmental goals with a capitalistic framework, and, rarely, center-right green parties (like the Latvian Green Party and Ecologist Green Party of Mexico), that hold anti-feminist views.

Examples of "green left" parties include GroenLinks in the Netherlands, the Green Party of the United States, the Left-Green Movement in Iceland, and the Green Party of Aotearoa New Zealand.

The name "Green Left" is also used by a variety of organisations which espouse socialist or Marxist principles, but with a greater emphasis on environmental preservation than previous iterations of socialism and communism.

Politics

Europe 
In Europe, the green left arose partly out of the declining Eurocommunist tendency that has been mostly associated with various communist parties in the continent. As a result, many former communist parties and remnants of communist parties were either reestablished or fused into existing green parties.

Far-left political parties or joint electoral lists have been formed over the years, most often between Marxist and radical greens. In the Netherlands, the GroenLinks party was formed in 1989 by a merger of a communist, pacifist, left-wing Christian and green parties. In December 2007, an Italian electoral coalition of the radical left was formed known as The Left – The Rainbow, comprising Federation of the Greens, two communist parties and a small democratic socialist party.

Elsewhere 
The green left has also been prominent in the green politics outside of Europe, especially in the United States, Australia and New Zealand.

See also 
 Eco-socialism
 Green Left (disambiguation)
 Left-wing politics

Green politics
Left-wing politics